Sphingius is a genus of araneomorph spiders in the family Liocranidae, containing 27 species restricted to South Asia and Southeast Asia.

Species
Sphingius barkudensis Gravely, 1931 – Bangladesh, India
Sphingius bifurcatus Dankittipakul, Tavano & Singtripop, 2011 – Thailand, Malaysia
Sphingius bilineatus Simon, 1906 – India
Sphingius caniceps Simon, 1906 – India
Sphingius deelemanae Zhang & Fu, 2010 – China
Sphingius elongatus Dankittipakul, Tavano & Singtripop, 2011 – Thailand
Sphingius gothicus Deeleman-Reinhold, 2001 – Thailand
Sphingius gracilis (Thorell, 1895) – China, Myanmar
Sphingius hainan Zhang, Fu & Zhu, 2009 – China
Sphingius kambakamensis Gravely, 1931 – India
Sphingius longipes Gravely, 1931 – India
Sphingius nilgiriensis Gravely, 1931 – India
Sphingius octomaculatus Deeleman-Reinhold, 2001 – Thailand
Sphingius paltaensis Biswas & Biswas, 1992 – India
Sphingius penicillus Deeleman-Reinhold, 2001 – Thailand
Sphingius prolixus Dankittipakul, Tavano & Singtripop, 2011 – Thailand
Sphingius punctatus Deeleman-Reinhold, 2001 – Thailand to Lesser Sunda Is.
Sphingius rama Dankittipakul, Tavano & Singtripop, 2011 – Thailand
Sphingius scrobiculatus Thorell, 1897 – China, Taiwan, Myanmar, Thailand
Sphingius scutatus Simon, 1897 – Sri Lanka
Sphingius songi Deeleman-Reinhold, 2001 – Thailand
Sphingius spinosus Dankittipakul, Tavano & Singtripop, 2011 – Thailand, Malaysia, Sumatra
Sphingius superbus Dankittipakul, Tavano & Singtripop, 2011 – Thailand, Malaysia
Sphingius thecatus Thorell, 1890T – Malaysia
Sphingius tristiculus Simon, 1903 – Vietnam
Sphingius vivax (Thorell, 1897) – Myanmar, Thailand, Vietnam, Malaysia, Philippines
Sphingius zhangi Zhang, Fu & Zhu, 2009 – China

References

Liocranidae
Spiders of Asia
Araneomorphae genera